Yuki Bhambri and Divij Sharan triumphed in an all Indian final, beating Somdev Devvarman and Sanam Singh 7–6(7–2), 6–7(4–7), [10–8]

Seeds

Draw

Draw

References
 Main Draw

Shanghai Challenger - Doubles
2014 Doubles